Samuel Castriota (November 2, 1885 – July 8, 1932) was an Argentinian pianist, guitarist and composer.  He is the composer of the tango Mi noche triste, among other works.

Born in Buenos Aires, Castriota spent his childhood in the nearby town of San Miguel where he learned to play the guitar "by ear" that is without reading music. He returned to Buenos Aires at age 16 and began performing in small ensembles while also learning to play the piano.

He won a major prize in the lottery, and moved away from music toward establishing a hairdressing business. Eventually, however, he returned to his musical hobby and played piano in a trio that included himself, Vicente Loduca on bandoneon and Francisco Canaro on violin.

In the middle of the first decade of the twentieth century, Castriota released an instrumental tango, and Pascual Contursi provided lyrics. Carlos Gardel brought the names of Castriota and Contursi to public attention.  Contursi had added lyrics to tangos composed by other artists, but not with the success that came from the collaboration with Castriota on Mi noche triste.

Castriota continued to direct his orchestra, alternating as pianist, and composing new pieces.  However, those new pieces never came close to having the impact of Mi noche triste. He died in Buenos Aires on July 8, 1932.

Compositions

A la vejez (In old age)
A Trípoli
Atorrante (letra de Juan Andrés Bruno)
Buen ejemplo (Good example)
Campero (Camper)
Chica moderna (Modern girl)
¡Cómo brilla! (How bright!)
Como quiera (However you want)
Como una flor (Like a flower)
Con su china
Cordobesita
Cotorrita
Despechando
Dolor de ausencia (letra de Carlos R. De Paoli)
Don Florencio
El arroyito (The creek)
El botonazo
El ciruja de Sorrento
El gaucho (The cowboy)
El gorrión (Sparrow)
El loco de los inventos (The crazy inventions)
El señuelo (The lure)
Flor de cardo (Thistle)
Francia (France)
Inesita
Jardín de las rosas
La cotorrita (The parrot)
La mañanita
La parroquiana (The parishioner)
La piba del norte
La yerra
Las margaritas (Daisies)
Lamento del corazón
Mi coronel (Colonel)
Mi noche alegre (My cheerful night)
Mi noche triste (My sad night)
Mi querida (My dear)
Nido de amor (Love nest)
Notas lejanas
Patio olvidado 
Picardía (Craftiness)
Puerto Belgrano
Rebelde (Rebel)
Reja de mis amores
Reliquias camperas
Sentate hermano (Bebé conmigo)
¿Te acordás, Rafaela? (Do you remember, Rafaela?)
Una sonrisa (A smile)
Vieja milonga

External links
Samuel Castriota at todotango.com
Samuel Castriota at tango.info

1885 births
1932 deaths
Argentine musicians
People from Buenos Aires
Tango musicians